Mammoth (Baran Flinders) is a supervillain appearing in media published by DC Comics. Alongside his sister Shimmer, he is a founding member of the Fearsome Five and enemy of the Teen Titans.

Publication history
Mammoth first appeared in The New Teen Titans #3 (January 1981) and was created by Marv Wolfman and George Pérez.

Fictional character biography
Mammoth is one of the founding members of the Fearsome Five, and became an enemy of the Teen Titans, Superman, and the Outsiders. He is highly devoted to his sister Selinda (a.k.a. Shimmer), also a founding member of the Fearsome Five. A towering hulk of a man with immense physical strength and durability, Mammoth is intellectually and emotionally underdeveloped (so much so that he was once tricked into surrendering to a Superman whose powers had recently been lost thanks to Lex Luthor's use of Mister Mxyzptlk's red kryptonite thanks to Superman simply faking confidence that he could defeat Mammoth), and he lacks skill as a hand-to-hand combatant.

Mammoth at one point retired to a Tibetan monastery along with his sister although shortly thereafter discovered Psimon (himself a former member of the Fearsome Five). Psimon used his mental abilities to subdue Mammoth and turn Shimmer into glass, which he then proceeded to shatter in an act of vengeance. Mammoth subsequently works with former ally Gizmo, apparently unable to comprehend his sister was dead, and believing they were looking for her.

Mammoth later appears in a fight with Booster Gold, which he loses. He is surprised at being found out, as his crime was a spur-of-the-moment deal (he did not understand Gold has access to future information).

Mammoth alongside his Fearsome Five teammates appeared as members of the Alexander Luthor, Jr.'s Secret Society of Super Villains.

On the cover of Justice League of America (vol. 2) #13 , it shows Mammoth as a member of the new Injustice League and is one of the villains featured in Salvation Run. He is one of the villains sent to retrieve the Get Out of Hell free card from the Secret Six.

Mammoth later appeared as a member of Cheetah's Secret Society of Super Villains. He was among the villains in the ambush of the JSA led by Tapeworm.

Mammoth later appeared as a member of the revived Fearsome Five when his older sister breaks him out of jail, while he was trying to read to increase his intelligence, though, this only gives him words that do not fit the sentences they are in. His new-found "intelligence" does not quell his need to kill others, as he frequently suggests killing Wonder Girl while they have her bound in her own lasso.

Mammoth is later shown in the employ of Calculator, and is hired to capture the members of the Birds of Prey while they are celebrating at a male strip club.

The New 52 
In The New 52 timeline, Mammoth is reintroduced as a member of the Fearsome Five. The group is shown as part of the Society, which were working with the Crime Syndicate. Mammoth was sent by Grid with the other members if the Fearsome Five, Jinx, Gizmo, Shimmer and Psimon, to team up with Doctor Psycho and Hector Hammond where they had to fight against Cyborg and the Metal Men. He ends up being defeated by Gold.

Mammoth later appears where he is trying to kill Nightwing, Donna Troy and Garth. He is beaten by a teamwork punch by Garth and Donna Troy.

DC Rebirth
In DC Rebirth, Mammoth appeared as part of the Fearsome Five.

Powers and abilities
Mammoth possesses superhuman strength and durability, including a degree of protection from energy attacks.

Other versions
In JLA/Avengers #3, Mammoth appears as part of a group of villains who attack the Vision and Aquaman in Metropolis. He is blasted by the Vision, but is finally knocked out by Thor and restrained by Green Lantern.

In other media

Television
 A young Mammoth appears in Teen Titans, voiced by Kevin Michael Richardson. This version is a student of the H.I.V.E. Academy and member of the H.I.V.E. Five who often works with Jinx and Gizmo.
 A teenage Mammoth makes non-speaking appearances in Young Justice. This version is a member of the Light. First appearing as a human enforcer for Kobra, Mammoth receives a combination of Bane's Venom steroid and the Blockbuster formula, which greatly enhances his physical structure and strength, both of which allow him to overpower Bane and Superboy. Following his transformation, Mammoth serves under Queen Bee as a member of the sub-group Onslaught.
 Mammoth appears in Teen Titans Go!, voiced again by Kevin Michael Richardson.

Video games
 Mammoth appears as a boss in the 2005 Teen Titans video game, voiced again by Kevin Michael Richardson.
 Mammoth appears as a boss in the 2006 Teen Titans video game, voiced again by Kevin Michael Richardson.
 Mammoth appears in DC Universe Online, voiced by Eric Leikam. He appears as part of the "Sons of Trigon" DLC
 The Teen Titans Go! incarnation of Mammoth appears in Lego Dimensions, voiced by Khary Payton.
 Mammoth appears as a playable character in Lego DC Super-Villains, voiced by Darin De Paul.

Miscellaneous
 The Teen Titans animated series incarnation of Mammoth appears in the comic Teen Titans Go! as a founding member of the Fearsome Five.
 Mammoth appears in DC Super Hero Girls as a background student of Super Hero High.

References

Inline citations

General references

External links

DC Comics characters with superhuman strength
DC Comics male supervillains
Fictional genetically engineered characters
DC Comics metahumans
Comics characters introduced in 1981
Characters created by George Pérez
Characters created by Marv Wolfman
Fictional Australian people